St Athan Road railway station served the village of St Athan in the Vale of Glamorgan in South Wales.

History
The station was built by the Cowbridge and Aberthaw Railway, and opened along with the line on 1 October 1892. As with St Mary Church Road, the preceding station on the line, St Athan Road was not very near the village it served, lying about a mile to the east. It also saw traffic from Llancadle, Aberthaw and Gileston.

From the start, St Athan Road was little-used. The line had been built with the intention of serving a new port at Aberthaw. When the plans for the port were abandoned, the Cowbridge and Aberthaw Railway fell swiftly into financial trouble and had to be absorbed by the Taff Vale Railway in 1895.

St Athan Road closed on 5 May 1930. The station staff were withdrawn and their remaining duties were transferred to the staff of Gileston station.

Crime
Two thefts occurred at St Athan Road in 1906. In March of that year, four and a half pence was stolen. In June, the stationmaster's watch was stolen.

Similarly named stations
For at least part of its life, Gileston railway station on the Vale of Glamorgan Line was known as 'Gileston for St Athan'.

The Great Western Railway opened St. Athan railway station (St Athan Halt until 1943) in 1939 to serve RAF St Athan. Like St Athan Road, this station was not close to the village either.

Notes

References
 
 
 

Railway stations in Great Britain closed in 1930
Disused railway stations in the Vale of Glamorgan
Railway stations in Great Britain opened in 1892
Former Taff Vale Railway stations
St Athan